The 2018–19 New Orleans Pelicans season was the 17th season of the New Orleans Pelicans franchise in the National Basketball Association (NBA). 

This season also marked the highest number of points scored in a game for the New Orleans franchise, with a franchise-high 149 points scored in their second game of the season on an October 19, 2018 win over the Sacramento Kings. However, the season also produced plenty of turmoil for the team through the surprising departure of DeMarcus Cousins to the Golden State Warriors in free agency, Anthony Davis announcing trade demands that ultimately were not met during this season, and the firing of general manager Dell Demps during the 2019 NBA All-Star Weekend. All of this would lead the Pelicans to another losing season with Davis on the team, with a 138–136 overtime loss to the Phoenix Suns on March 16, ultimately eliminating them from playoff contention.

On May 14, 2019, after the conclusion of this season, the Pelicans won the top draft choice, making it the second time they won the lottery.

Also, this season marked the end of the Anthony Davis era in New Orleans, as he was traded to the Los Angeles Lakers on July 6, 2019.

Draft

Roster

Standings

Division

Conference

Game log

Preseason 

|- style="background:#fcc;"
| 1
| September 30
| @ Chicago
| 
| Holiday, Jackson (16)
| Payton (8)
| Randle (5)
| United Center17,861
| 0–1
|- style="background:#fcc;"
| 2
| October 1
| @ Atlanta
| 
| Davis (16)
| McCoy (8)
| Payton (7)
| McCamish Pavilion6,619
| 0–2
|- style="background:#fcc;"
| 3
| October 5
| @ New York
| 
| Mirotic (19)
| Davis (13)
| Payton (7)
| Madison Square Garden17,162
| 0–3
|- style="background:#fcc;"
| 4
| October 10
| @ Miami
| 
| Randle (23)
| Diallo (8)
| Payton (8)
| American Airlines Arena19,600
| 0–4
|- style="background:#fcc;"
| 5
| October 11
| Toronto
| 
| Davis (36)
| Davis (15)
| Holiday (8)
| Smoothie King Center15,047
| 0–5

Regular season 

|- style="background:#cfc;"
| 1
| October 17
| @ Houston
| 
| Anthony Davis (32)
| Anthony Davis (16)
| Elfrid Payton (10)
| Toyota Center18,055
| 1–0
|- style="background:#cfc;"
| 2
| October 19
| Sacramento
| 
| Nikola Mirotic (36)
| Anthony Davis (10)
| Jrue Holiday (10)
| Smoothie King Center18,337
| 2–0
|- style="background:#cfc;"
| 3
| October 23
| LA Clippers
| 
| Anthony Davis (34)
| Anthony Davis (13)
| Jrue Holiday (9)
| Smoothie King Center14,625
| 3–0
|- style="background:#cfc;"
| 4
| October 26
| Brooklyn
| 
| Jrue Holiday (26)
| Anthony Davis (14)
| Elfrid Payton (6)
| Smoothie King Center15,272
| 4–0
|- style="background:#fcc;
| 5
| October 27
| Utah
| 
| Nikola Mirotic (25)
| Nikola Mirotic (8)
| Jrue Holiday (6)
| Smoothie King Center16,373
| 4–1
|- style="background:#fcc;
| 6
| October 29
| @ Denver
| 
| Julius Randle (24)
| Nikola Mirotic (10)
| Jrue Holiday (9)
| Pepsi Center15,217
| 4–2
|- style="background:#fcc;
| 7
| October 31
| @ Golden State
| 
| Jrue Holiday (28)
| Davis, Mirotic (12)
| Jrue Holiday (9)
| Oracle Arena19,596
| 4–3

|- style="background:#fcc;"
| 8
| November 1
| @ Portland
| 
| Julius Randle (29)
| Nikola Mirotic (13)
| Jrue Holiday (10)
| Moda Center18,921
| 4–4
|- style="background:#fcc;"
| 9
| November 3
| @ San Antonio
| 
| Jrue Holiday (29)
| Nikola Mirotic (16)
| Jrue Holiday (8)
| AT&T Center18,354
| 4–5
|- style="background:#fcc;"
| 10
| November 5
| @ Oklahoma City
| 
| Julius Randle (26)
| Nikola Mirotic (16)
| Jrue Holiday (14)
| Chesapeake Energy Arena18,203
| 4–6
|- style="background:#cfc;
| 11
| November 7
| Chicago
| 
| Anthony Davis (32)
| Davis, Mirotic (15)
| Jrue Holiday (9)
| Smoothie King Center15,514
| 5–6
|- style="background:#cfc;"
| 12
| November 10
| Phoenix
| 
| Anthony Davis (26)
| Julius Randle (16)
| Jrue Holiday (9)
| Smoothie King Center15,222
| 6–6
|- style="background:#cfc;"
| 13
| November 12
| @ Toronto
| 
| E'Twaun Moore (30)
| Anthony Davis (20)
| Jrue Holiday (14)
| Scotiabank Arena19,800
| 7–6
|- style="background:#fcc;"
| 14
| November 14
| @ Minnesota
| 
| E'Twaun Moore (31)
| Anthony Davis (11)
| Jrue Holiday (10)
| Target Center11,636
| 7–7
|- style="background:#cfc;"
| 15
| November 16
| New York
| 
| Anthony Davis (43)
| Anthony Davis (17)
| Jrue Holiday (10)
| Smoothie King Center14,717
| 8–7
|- style="background:#cfc"
| 16
| November 17
| Denver
| 
| Anthony Davis (40)
| Randle, Mirotic (10)
| Jrue Holiday, Davis (8)
| Smoothie King Center15,408
| 9–7
|-style="background:#cfc"
| 17
| November 19
| San Antonio
| 
| Anthony Davis (29)
| Julius Randle (14)
| Julius Randle (10)
| Smoothie King Center14,675
| 10–7
|-style="background:#fcc
| 18
| November 21
| @ Philadelphia
| 
| Holiday, Moore (30)
| Anthony Davis (16)
| Jrue Holiday (10)
| Wells Fargo Center20,352
| 10–8
|-style="background:#fcc
| 19
| November 23
| @ New York
| 
| Anthony Davis (33)
| Anthony Davis (12)
| Jrue Holiday (8)
| Madison Square Garden18,948
| 10–9
|-style="background:#fcc
| 20
| November 24
| @ Washington
| 
| Julius Randle (29)
| Julius Randle (15)
| Jrue Holiday (9)
| Capital One Arena15,165
| 10–10
|- style="background:#fcc;"
| 21
| November 26
| Boston
| 
| Anthony Davis (27)
| Anthony Davis (16)
| Jrue Holiday (7)
| Smoothie King Center15,189
| 10–11
|- style="background:#cfc;"
| 22
| November 28
| Washington
| 
| Jrue Holiday (29)
| Anthony Davis (15)
| Tim Frazier (12)
| Smoothie King Center13,570
| 11–11
|- style="background:#fcc;"
| 23
| November 30
| @ Miami
| 
| Anthony Davis (41)
| Julius Randle (10)
| Tim Frazier (9)
| AmericanAirlines Arena19,600
| 11–12

|- style="background:#cfc
| 24
| December 2
| @ Charlotte
| 
| Anthony Davis (36)
| Anthony Davis (19)
| Tim Frazier (9)
| Spectrum Center15,336
| 12–12
|- style="background:#fcc
| 25
| December 3
| LA Clippers
| 
| Julius Randle (37)
| Anthony Davis (13)
| Jrue Holiday (14)
| Smoothie King Center13,822
| 12–13
|- style="background:#cfc
| 26
| December 5
| Dallas
| 
| Davis, Randle (27)
| Julius Randle (18)
| Anthony Davis (9)
| Smoothie King Center14,810
| 13–13
|- style="background:#fcc
| 27
| December 7
| Memphis
| 
| Julius Randle (26)
| Julius Randle (13)
| Jrue Holiday (11)
| Smoothie King Center18,447
| 13–14
|- style="background:#cfc
| 28
| December 9
| @ Detroit
| 
| Jrue Holiday (37)
| Anthony Davis (9)
| Tim Frazier (8)
| Little Caesars Arena14,705
| 14–14
|- style="background:#fcc
| 29
| December 10
| @ Boston
| 
| Anthony Davis (41)
| Julius Randle (11)
| Jrue Holiday (10)
| TD Garden18,624
| 14–15
|- style="background:#cfc
| 30
| December 12
| Oklahoma City
| 
| Anthony Davis (44)
| Anthony Davis (18)
| Jrue Holiday (10)
| Smoothie King Center14,450
| 15–15
|- style="background:#fcc
| 31
| December 16
| Miami
| 
| Anthony Davis (27)
| Anthony Davis (12)
| Anthony Davis (7)
| Smoothie King Center15,535
| 15–16
|- style="background:#fcc
| 32
| December 19
| @ Milwaukee
| 
| Anthony Davis (27)
| Anthony Davis (11)
| Jrue Holiday (12)
| Fiserv Forum17,341
| 15–17
|- style="background:#fcc
| 33
| December 21
| @ LA Lakers
| 
| Anthony Davis (30)
| Anthony Davis (20)
| Jrue Holiday (10)
| Staples Center18,997
| 15–18
|- style="background:#fcc
| 34
| December 23
| @ Sacramento
| 
| Jrue Holiday (27)
| Anthony Davis (17)
| Tim Frazier (7)
| Golden 1 Center16,643
| 15–19
|- style="background:#fcc
| 35
| December 26
| @ Dallas
| 
| Anthony Davis (32)
| Anthony Davis (18)
| Tim Frazier (7)
| American Airlines Center16,643
| 15–20
|- style="background:#cfc
| 36
| December 28
| Dallas
| 
| Anthony Davis (48)
| Anthony Davis (17)
| Jrue Holiday (8)
| Smoothie King Center18,364
| 16–20
|- style="background:#fcc
| 37
| December 29
| Houston
| 
| Julius Randle (23)
| Davis, Randle (11)
| Jrue Holiday (9)
| Smoothie King Center17,555
| 16–21
|- style="background:#cfc
| 38
| December 31
| Minnesota
| 
| Julius Randle (33)
| Julius Randle (11)
| Jrue Holiday (9)
| Smoothie King Center14,904
| 17–21

|- style="background:#fcc
| 39
| January 2
| @ Brooklyn
| 
| Anthony Davis (34)
| Anthony Davis (26)
| Jrue Holiday (7)
| Barclays Center16,890
| 17–22
|- style="background:#cfc
| 40
| January 5
| @ Cleveland
| 
| Holiday, Randle (22)
| Julius Randle (12)
| Julius Randle (8)
| Quicken Loans Arena19,432
| 18–22
|- style="background:#cfc
| 41
| January 7
| Memphis
| 
| Anthony Davis (36)
| Anthony Davis (13)
| Jrue Holiday (6)
| Smoothie King Center14,624
| 19–22
|- style="background:#cfc
| 42
| January 9
| Cleveland
| 
| Anthony Davis (38)
| Anthony Davis (13)
| Elfrid Payton (9)
| Smoothie King Center15,058
| 20–22
|- style="background:#fcc
| 43
| January 12
| @ Minnesota
| 
| Anthony Davis (30)
| Anthony Davis (14)
| Jrue Holiday (7)
| Target Center16,384
| 20–23
|- style="background:#cfc
| 44
| January 14
| @ LA Clippers
| 
| Anthony Davis (46)
| Anthony Davis (16)
| Jrue Holiday (8)
| Staples Center15,283
| 21–23
|- style="background:#fcc
| 45
| January 16
| @ Golden State
| 
| Anthony Davis (30)
| Anthony Davis (18)
| Elfrid Payton (12)
| Oracle Arena19,596
| 21–24
|- style="background:#fcc
| 46
| January 18
| @ Portland
| 
| Anthony Davis (27)
| Julius Randle (9)
| Jrue Holiday (6)
| Moda Center19,598
| 21–25
|- style="background:#cfc
| 47
| January 21
| @ Memphis
| 
| Jrue Holiday (21)
| Julius Randle (12)
| Jrue Holiday (6)
| FedExForum17,794
| 22–25
|- style="background:#fcc
| 48
| January 23
| Detroit
| 
| Jrue Holiday (29)
| Julius Randle (13)
| Jrue Holiday (7)
| Smoothie King Center18,181
| 22–26
|- style="background:#fcc
| 49
| January 24
| @ Oklahoma City
| 
| Jrue Holiday (22)
| Jrue Holiday (9)
| Jrue Holiday (13)
| Chesapeake Energy Arena18,203
| 22–27
|- style="background:#fcc
| 50
| January 26
| San Antonio
| 
| Jrue Holiday (29)
| Jahlil Okafor (15)
| Elfrid Payton (5)
| Smoothie King Center17,724
| 22–28
|- style="background:#cfc
| 51
| January 29
| @ Houston
| 
| Jahlil Okafor (27)
| Jahlil Okafor (12)
| Tim Frazier (10)
| Toyota Center18,055
| 23–28
|- style="background:#fcc
| 52
| January 30
| Denver
| 
| Jrue Holiday (22)
| Okafor, Frazier, K.Williams (8)
| Tim Frazier (8)
| Smoothie King Center14,211
| 23–29

|- style="background:#fcc
| 53
| February 2
| @ San Antonio
| 
| Frank Jackson (25)
| Diallo, K.Williams (8)
| Tim Frazier (8)
| AT&T Center18,354
| 23–30
|- style="background:#fcc
| 54
| February 4
| Indiana
| 
| Jahlil Okafor (25)
| Cheick Diallo (14)
| Jrue Holiday (9)
| Smoothie King Center15,780
| 23–31
|- style="background:#cfc
| 55
| February 6
| @ Chicago
| 
| Julius Randle (31)
| Cheick Diallo (9)
| Jrue Holiday (11)
| United Center18,116
| 24–31
|- style="background:#cfc
| 56
| February 8
| Minnesota
| 
| Anthony Davis (32)
| Anthony Davis (9)
| Jrue Holiday (9)
| Smoothie King Center16,980
| 25–31
|- style="background:#fcc
| 57
| February 9
| @ Memphis
| 
| Julius Randle (21)
| Anthony Davis (16)
| Kenrich Williams (7)
| FedExForum16,841
| 25–32
|- style="background:#fcc
| 58
| February 12
| Orlando
|  
| E'Twaun Moore (19)
| Okafor, Williams (7)
| Tim Frazier (7)
| Smoothie King Center15,733
| 25–33
|- style="background:#cfc
| 59
| February 14
| Oklahoma City
|  
| Julius Randle (33)
| Kenrich Williams (12)
| Jrue Holiday (7)
| Smoothie King Center15,686
| 26–33
|- style="background:#fcc
| 60
| February 22
| @ Indiana
| 
| Cheick Diallo (16)
| Cheick Diallo (18)
| Davis, Holiday, Payton, S. Johnson (4)
| Bankers Life Fieldhouse16,962
| 26–34
|- style="background:#cfc
| 61
| February 23
| LA Lakers
| 
| Jrue Holiday (27)
| Cheick Diallo (10)
| Elfrid Payton (9)
| Smoothie King Center18,626
| 27–34
|- style="background:#fcc
| 62
| February 25
| Philadelphia
| 
| Jrue Holiday (22)
| Julius Randle (14)
| Elfrid Payton (14)
| Smoothie King Center17,194
| 27–35
|- style="background:#fcc
| 63
| February 27
| @ LA Lakers
| 
| Julius Randle (35)
| Elfrid Payton (11)
| Jrue Holiday (10)
| Staples Center18,997
| 27–36

|- style="background:#cfc
| 64
| March 1
| @ Phoenix
| 
| Julius Randle (22)
| Cheick Diallo (10)
| Elfrid Payton (10)
| Talking Stick Resort Arena14,123
| 28–36
|- style="background:#cfc
| 65
| March 2
| @ Denver
| 
| Jrue Holiday (29)
| Julius Randle (10)
| Elfrid Payton (10)
| Pepsi Center19,155
| 29–36
|- style="background:#cfc
| 66
| March 4
| @ Utah
| 
| Holiday, Randle (30)
| Anthony Davis (11)
| Elfrid Payton (6)
| Vivint Smart Home Arena18,306
| 30–36
|- style="background:#fcc
| 67
| March 6
| Utah
| 
| Julius Randle (23)
| Elfrid Payton (8)
| Davis, Holiday, Randle, Payton (3)
| Smoothie King Center14,681
| 30–37
|- style="background:#fcc
| 68
| March 8
| Toronto
| 
| Frank Jackson (20)
| Julius Randle (9)
| Julius Randle (7)
| Smoothie King Center17,325
| 30–38
|- style="background:#fcc
| 69
| March 10
| @ Atlanta
| 
| Jackson, Randle (23)
| Elfrid Payton (10)
| Elfrid Payton (10)
| State Farm Arena14,337
| 30–39
|- style="background:#fcc
| 70
| March 12
| Milwaukee
| 
| Julius Randle (23)
| Elfrid Payton (15)
| Elfrid Payton (11)
| Smoothie King Center15,562
| 30–40
|- style="background:#fcc"
| 71
| March 15
| Portland
| 
| Julius Randle (45)
| Elfrid Payton (12)
| Elfrid Payton (16)
| Smoothie King Center16,177
| 30–41
|- style="background:#fcc"
| 72
| March 16
| Phoenix
| 
| Julius Randle (21)
| Elfrid Payton (13)
| Elfrid Payton (16)
| Smoothie King Center17,641
| 30–42
|- style="background:#cfc"
| 73
| March 18
| @ Dallas
| 
| Julius Randle (30)
| Kenrich Williams (11)
| Elfrid Payton (11)
| American Airlines Center20,276
| 31–42
|- style="background:#fcc"
| 74
| March 20
| @ Orlando
| 
| Stanley Johnson (18)
| Cheick Diallo (11)
| Clark, Jackson, Miller (4)
| Amway Center17,005
| 31–43
|- style="background:#fcc"
| 75
| March 24
| Houston
| 
| Frank Jackson (19)
| Anthony Davis (10)
| Elfrid Payton (8)
| Smoothie King Center17,048
| 31–44
|- style="background:#fcc"
| 76
| March 26
| Atlanta
| 
| Julius Randle (24)
| Randle, Wood (9)
| Elfrid Payton (9)
| Smoothie King Center14,751
| 31–45
|- style="background:#cfc"
| 77
| March 28
| Sacramento
| 
| Julius Randle (34)
| Julius Randle (10)
| Elfrid Payton (9)
| Smoothie King Center13,976
| 32–45
|- style="background:#fcc"
| 78
| March 31
| L. A. Lakers
| 
| Julius Randle (17)
| Christian Wood (11)
| Elfrid Payton (6)
| Smoothie King Center18,562
| 32–46

|- style="background:#fcc"
| 79
| April 3
| Charlotte
| 
| Julius Randle (34)
| Julius Randle (11)
| Elfrid Payton (7)
| Smoothie King Center16,844
| 32–47
|- style="background:#fcc"
| 80
| April 5
| @ Phoenix
| 
| Julius Randle (31)
| Julius Randle (14)
| Elfrid Payton (12)
| Talking Stick Resort Arena16,410
| 32–48
|- style="background:#cfc"
| 81
| April 7
| @ Sacramento
| 
| Ian Clark (31)
| Jahlil Okafor (14)
| Elfrid Payton (14)
| Golden 1 Center17,583
| 33–48
|- style="background:#fcc"
| 82
| April 9
| Golden State
| 
| Jahlil Okafor (30)
| Christian Wood (12)
| Elfrid Payton (7)
| Smoothie King Center17,090
| 33–49

Player statistics

|-
| align="left"|≠ || align="center"| SG
| 12 || 0 || 167 || 9 || 10 || 1 || 0 || 34
|-
| align="left"| || align="center"| SG
| 60 || 6 || 973 || 89 || 94 || 22 || 8 || 401
|-
| align="left"| || align="center"| C
| 56 || 56 || 1,850 || style=";"|672 || 218 || 88 || style=";"|135 || 1,452
|-
| align="left"| || align="center"| PF
| 64 || 1 || 896 || 332 || 33 || 29 || 33 || 387
|-
| align="left"|‡ || align="center"| PG
| 47 || 17 || 909 || 137 || 206 || 25 || 4 || 235
|-
| align="left"|‡ || align="center"| PG
| 6 || 0 || 38 || 5 || 7 || 0 || 0 || 9
|-
| align="left"| || align="center"| SF
| 44 || 15 || 878 || 133 || 55 || 23 || 10 || 191
|-
| align="left"| || align="center"| SG
| 67 || style=";"|67 || style=";"|2,402 || 334 || style=";"|518 || style=";"|109 || 54 || 1,420
|-
| align="left"| || align="center"| PG
| 61 || 16 || 1,169 || 134 || 69 || 25 || 2 || 495
|-
| align="left"| || align="center"| SF
| 18 || 0 || 247 || 42 || 28 || 12 || 1 || 96
|-
| align="left"|† || align="center"| SF
| 26 || 13 || 377 || 54 || 16 || 12 || 7 || 95
|-
| align="left"| || align="center"| SF
| 69 || 15 || 1,757 || 128 || 146 || 40 || 23 || 567
|-
| align="left"|† || align="center"| PF
| 32 || 22 || 925 || 264 || 35 || 21 || 25 || 534
|-
| align="left"| || align="center"| SG
| 53 || 36 || 1,463 || 127 || 102 || 40 || 8 || 633
|-
| align="left"| || align="center"| C
| 59 || 24 || 935 || 278 || 40 || 15 || 40 || 484
|-
| align="left"| || align="center"| PG
| 42 || 42 || 1,250 || 220 || 320 || 44 || 17 || 446
|-
| align="left"| || align="center"| PF
| style=";"|73 || 49 || 2,232 || 634 || 229 || 52 || 45 || style=";"|1,565
|-
| align="left"|‡ || align="center"| C
| 2 || 0 || 20 || 4 || 1 || 0 || 0 || 8
|-
| align="left"| || align="center"| SF
| 46 || 29 || 1,079 || 219 || 83 || 45 || 19 || 279
|-
| align="left"| || align="center"| PF
| 8 || 2 || 189 || 63 || 6 || 7 || 10 || 13
|}
After all games.
‡Waived during the season
†Traded during the season
≠Acquired during the season

Transactions

Trades

Free agency

Re-signed

Additions

Subtractions

Awards, records and milestones

Awards

Records

 The Pelicans set an NBA record in:
 Most combined 3-point field goals made in a game
 43 – Pelicans (19) vs. Golden State Warriors (24) on January 16, 2019

 The Pelicans set a franchise record in:
 Most points scored in a game
 149 in a win against the Sacramento Kings on October 19, 2018

 Anthony Davis set a franchise record in:
 Most rebounds in a game
 26 against the Brooklyn Nets on January 2, 2019

 Elfrid Payton tied a franchise record in:
 Most triple-doubles in a season
 6 – tied with Chris Paul who set the record during the 2008–09 season

Milestones

 On October 17, 2018, in a win against the Houston Rockets, Elfrid Payton became the first player to average 10 points, 10 rebounds, and 10 assists in a game since Kyle Lowry did it on March 2, 2013.

 On November 7, 2018, Jrue Holiday reached 2,000 career assists in a win against the Chicago Bulls.

 On November 21, 2018, Anthony Davis reached 10,000 career points in a loss against the Philadelphia 76ers, becoming the eighth youngest player at 25 years and 255 days to reach the milestone.

 On January 29, 2019, Holiday recorded 19 points, eight assists, six rebounds and six blocks in a win against the Houston Rockets, becoming the first guard in NBA history to record at least 17 points, six rebounds, seven assists and six blocks in a game.

 On March 12, 2019, Payton recorded his second consecutive triple-double in a loss against the Milwaukee Bucks, becoming the first New Orleans player to have a triple-double in consecutive games since Chris Paul in 2008.

 On March 16, 2019, Payton recorded his fourth consecutive triple-double in a loss against the Phoenix Suns, joining James Harden, Magic Johnson, Michael Jordan and Russell Westbrook as the only players since the 1983–84 season to record triple-doubles in as many as four straight games.

 On March 18, 2019, Payton recorded his fifth consecutive triple-double in a win against the Dallas Mavericks, becoming the fifth player in NBA history to record five consecutive triple-doubles, joining Wilt Chamberlain, Michael Jordan, Oscar Robertson, and Russell Westbrook.

Team milestones

 During the season, the Pelicans led the league in:
 Total two-point field goals made with 2,739
 Two-point field goals made per game with 33.4

References

New Orleans Pelicans seasons
New Orleans Pelicans
New Orleans Pelicans
New Orleans Pelicans